Lions' Gate, Lion Gate or similar terms may refer to:

Gates
Lion Gate at Mycenae in Greece
Lion Gate, one of the entrances to the ancient Hittite city of Hattusa, now in Turkey
Lion Gate, one of the entrances to the gardens of Hampton Court Palace in London
Lion Gate, one of the entrances to Kew Gardens in London
Lions Gate (Porta Leoni), Roman gate in Verona
Lions' Gate, also called St. Stephen's Gate, Old City of Jerusalem
Porte des Lions, monumental passageway in the Louvre Palace

Places (real or fictional)
Lions Gate Bridge in British Columbia
Lionsgate City, a fictional setting in Kenneth Oppel's 2004 novel Airborn

Other uses
Lion's Gate Project, professional wrestling developmental branch
Liongate Capital Management
Lionsgate, US-based entertainment company
Lionsgate Films, the company's film studio division
Lionsgate Academy, a public charter school in Minnesota, United States
 Lions at the Gate, an American heavy metal musical ensemble